Stupava Synagogue, built in 1803, is located in Stupava, Malacky District, in Slovakia.

Architecture 
The rectangular building is made of massive walls with simple Baroque windows and has a saddleback roof. An external staircase, attached diagonally to the western facade, gives access to the women's gallery. Several oval ventilation openings in the gable are typical for the local architecture of the region.

The interior consists of the main prayer hall with a vestibule and study-room to the west. Above these is the women's prayer room. The prayer hall is of the nine-field (nine-bay) type, In these halls the vaulting rests on four tall pillars and on corresponding wall pilasters. The columns and the pilasters are situated in equal spacing and dividing the roof-area into nine equal fields. In these synagogues the bimah is a free-standing podium or a bower situated within the central field between the pillars. The Stupava synagogue and the Bardejov Old Synagogue are the only two surviving buildings of this type in Slovakia.

Nothing remains of the original furnishing, though the bimah-platform has been preserved and the position of the Holy Ark is still visible and marked by a niche in the wall.

The dilapidated building has been restored since 2008 is being used for cultural purposes of the Slovak Jewish community.

See also 
 List of synagogues in Slovakia

References

Synagogues in Slovakia
19th-century architecture in Slovakia